Lyces aurimutua is a moth of the family Notodontidae first described by Francis Walker in 1854. It is endemic to the Atlantic coastal forest of Brazil.

References

Notodontidae
Endemic fauna of Brazil
Moths of South America
Moths described in 1854